The WSU King and Queen of the Ring is an annual professional wrestling mixed tag team tournament promoted by Women Superstars Uncensored (WSU). From 2006 to 2012, WSU co-promoted the tournament with National Wrestling Superstars (NWS), but in 2013 partnered up with Combat Zone Wrestling (CZW) for the tournament.

2006
The winners of the 2006 King and Queen Tournament were Julio Dinero and Kara Slice.

2007
The winners of the 2007 King and Queen tournament were Danny Demanto and Melissa Stripes. The first round matches were three-way matches.

2008
The winners of the 2008 King and Queen tournament were Rhett Titus and Nikki Roxx (who interjected themselves into the final round match).

2009
The winners of the 2009 King and Queen tournament were Jay Lethal and Miss April.

2010
The winners of the 2010 King and Queen tournament were Devon Moore and Alicia.

2011
The winners of the 2011 King and Queen tournament were Julio Dinero and Mercedes Martinez.

2012

2013
For 2013, WSU partnered up with Combat Zone Wrestling (CZW) instead of NWS for the newly renamed "Queen and King of the Ring Tournament".

2014
The 2014 tournament was held on May 10.

2017
The 2017 tournament was held on September 11 and won by Su Yung and Blackwater.

References

Women's professional wrestling tournaments
Women Superstars Uncensored
Tag team tournaments